Misawa International Sports Center is an arena in Misawa, Aomori, Japan.

Facilities
Main arena - 2,080m2（52.0m×40.0m）
Sub arena - 745.76m2（37.288m×20.0m）
Training room
Running course - 200m

References

External links
Misawa International Sports Centre

Aomori Wat's
Basketball venues in Japan
Indoor arenas in Japan
Sports venues in Aomori Prefecture
Sports venues completed in 2017
2017 establishments in Japan
Misawa, Aomori